Wahnata County was an extinct county in Minnesota Territory. Created as one of the original 9 counties in 1849, the county was dissolved in 1851.

    Minnesota counties (−) (±)Kittson County, Minnesota (−) (±)1878 establishments in Minnesota (−) (±)Populated places established in 1878 (−) (±)(+)

Hidden categories:

    Use mdy dates from April 2019Articles with short descriptionShort description is different from WikidataWikipedia articles with LCCN identifiersWikipedia articles with VIAF identifiersWikipedia articles with WORLDCATID identifiersCoordinates on Wikidata

A start-class article from Wikipedia, the free encyclopedia
  (Redirected from Pembina County, Minnesota)
Jump to navigation
Jump to search
Kittson County
U.S. county
Lake Bronson Dam
Lake Bronson Dam
Map of Minnesota highlighting Kittson County
Location within the U.S. state of Minnesota
Map of the United States highlighting Minnesota
Minnesota's location within the U.S.
Coordinates: 48°47′N 96°47′W
Country	 United States
State	 Minnesota
Founded	March 9, 1878 (created by renaming Pembina Co.)
February 25, 1879 (organized)
Named for	Norman Wolfred Kittson
Seat	Hallock
Largest city	Hallock
Area
 • Total	
 • Land	
 • Water	  0.4%%
Population (2010)
 • Total	4,552
 • Estimate (2019)
	4,298
 • Density	3.87/sq mi (1.49/km2)
Time zone	UTC−6 (Central)
 • Summer (DST)	UTC−5 (CDT)
Congressional district	7th
Website	www.co.kittson.mn.us

Kittson County is a county in the northwestern part of the U.S. state of Minnesota along the Canada–US border, south of the Canadian province of Manitoba. As of the 2010 census, the population was 4,552.[1] Its county seat is Hallock.[2]
Contents

    1 History
        1.1 Historic sites
    2 Geography
        2.1 Major highways
        2.2 Adjacent counties and rural municipalities
        2.3 Protected areas[6]
        2.4 Lakes[6]
    3 Demographics
    4 2000 census
    5 Communities
        5.1 Cities
        5.2 Unincorporated communities
        5.3 Ghost town
        5.4 Townships
        5.5 Unorganized territories
    6 Politics
    7 See also
    8 References

1 History

Evidence of occupation dating back 1800 years has been confirmed through archaeological expeditions done in the 1930s and 1970s around the burial mounds on the sand ridges in the eastern part of the county, which date to the Woodland Period. Evidence has been found that the Laurel, Arvilla, St. Croix, and Blackduck complexes were the area's early occupants. Approximately 400 years ago, the Cree, Assiniboine, Sioux and Ojibway inhabited the county.

The early explorers of the region were fur traders. Pembina, North Dakota's oldest settlement, across the Red River from Kittson County, dates from 1797, when the first trading post was established by Charles Baptiste Chaboillez of the Northwest Fur Company. The Hudson Bay and American Fur Companies were also in Pembina as the fur trading industry increased. The fur traders and voyageurs traveled on the eastern side of the Red. Alexander Henry the younger, who erected a fort for the North West Company in Pembina, is thought to be the first white man to test agriculture in the valley. Joe Rolette, who started a fur post for the American Fur Company in Pembina, and Norman W. Kittson (for whom the county is named),[3] were two early entrepreneurs who opened this area by developing the Red River Ox Cart trails and broadening the use of oxcarts. The need for oxcarts diminished as steamboats became the new mode for transporting furs and supplies. The steamboats were eventually replaced by the railroad.

Pembina County was one of five large counties established by the Minnesota Territory legislature on October 27, 1849. It was not organized at that time. On March 9, 1878, the Minnesota Legislature renamed Pembina County Kittson County. On February 25, 1879, Kittson County was divided, creating Marshall County. The county seat, Hallock, was organized in 1880. Kittson County was further diminished in 1894 when Roseau County was partitioned off. Kittson County has retained its present boundaries since 1894.[4]

St. Vincent, which is directly across the Red River from Pembina, was settled in 1857. With rumors of a railroad coming through, settlers moved there to stake their claims. Many of these early settlers were Métis, a mixture of native and naturalized North Americans. In 1878, the St. Paul & Pacific Railroad line reached St. Vincent and opened the area to settlement. It extended through the western portion of the county, with Donaldson, Kennedy, Hallock, Northcote, Humboldt and St. Vincent established along the line. The eastern portion of the county was settled in the early 1900s. The Soo Line railroad was completed in 1904 and the communities of Karlstad, Halma, Bronson, Lancaster, Orleans and Noyes were established. Scandinavians, Ukrainians, Polish, Scottish, Irish, English, Germans, French Canadians and Métis all contributed to Kittson County's melting pot.

Once home to over 10,000 residents, the county population declined below 5,000 in 2006.[5]
1.1 Historic sites

Three sites in the county are listed in the National Register of Historic Places: the St. Nicholas Orthodox Church, in Caribou Township; the burial mounds known as the "Lake Bronson Site", in Norway and Percy Townships; and the Lake Bronson State Park WPA/Rustic Style Historic Resources, which include an observation tower and several buildings. Lake Bronson State Park also has interpretive sites for the tower, a pioneer cemetery and the WPA camp.
2 Geography

Kittson County is in Minnesota's northwest corner, on the borders of North Dakota and Canada. The Red River flows north along the county's western border. The South Fork of Two Rivers flows east through the central part of the county on its way to discharge into the Red; it meets the Middle Fork at Hallock, and the combined flow meets the North Fork a few miles east of the Red. The Joe River flows northwest out of the county into Canada, to discharge into the Red a few miles past the international border.

Kittson County was once part of glacial Lake Agassiz. Evidence of this prehistoric lake can still be seen in the county's topography. Remnants of McCauleyville Beach can be found in the eastern part of the county, an area of sandy soil and sand ridges. Other evidence of the glacier and Lake Agassiz is the approximately 140' drop in elevation from the eastern part of the county to the western part, near the Red River Valley, with its proliferation of black rich soil. Lake Bronson is a man-made reservoir, completed in 1937.
Soils of Kittson County[9]
2.1 Major highways

    US 59.svg U.S. Highway 59
    US 75.svg U.S. Highway 75
    MN-11.svg Minnesota State Highway 11
    MN-171.svg Minnesota State Highway 171
    MN-175.svg Minnesota State Highway 175
    MN-220.svg Minnesota State Highway 220

2.2 Adjacent counties and rural municipalities

    Town of Emerson, Manitoba (north)
    Rural Municipality of Franklin, Manitoba (north)
    Rural Municipality of Stuartburn, Manitoba (north)
    Roseau County, Minnesota (east)
    Marshall County, Minnesota (south)
    Walsh County, North Dakota (southwest)
    Pembina County, North Dakota (west)

2.3 Protected areas[6]

    Beaches State Wildlife Management Area
    Lake Bronson Parklands Scientific and Natural Area
    Lake Bronson State Park

2.4 Lakes[6]

    Lake Bronson
    Lake Stella
    Twin Lakes

3 Demographics
Historical population
Census 	Pop. 		%±
1860	1,612		—
1870	64		−96.0%
1880	905		1,314.1%
1890	5,387		495.2%
1900	7,889		46.4%
1910	9,669		22.6%
1920	10,638		10.0%
1930	9,688		−8.9%
1940	10,717		10.6%
1950	9,649		−10.0%
1960	8,343		−13.5%
1970	6,853		−17.9%
1980	6,672		−2.6%
1990	5,767		−13.6%
2000	5,285		−8.4%
2010	4,552		−13.9%
2019 (est.)	4,298	[10]	−5.6%
US Decennial Census[11]
1790-1960[12] 1900-1990[13]
1990-2000[14] 2010-2019[1]
Age pyramid of county residents based on 2000 US census data
4 2000 census

As of the 2000 United States Census, there were 5,285 people, 2,167 households, and 1,447 families in the county. The population density was 4.81/sqmi (1.86/km2). There were 2,719 housing units at an average density of 2.47/sqmi (0.96/km2). The racial makeup of the county was 98.09% White, 0.15% Black or African American, 0.26% Native American, 0.25% Asian, 0.38% from other races, and 0.87% from two or more races. 1.27% of the population were Hispanic or Latino of any race. 30.1% were of Norwegian, 25.7% Swedish, 13.7% German and 6.6% Polish ancestry. Kittson County had the highest percentage of Swedish speakers of any county in the United States.

There were 2,167 households, out of which 29.20% had children under the age of 18 living with them, 57.40% were married couples living together, 6.00% had a female householder with no husband present, and 33.20% were non-families. 30.50% of all households were made up of individuals, and 16.30% had someone living alone who was 65 years of age or older. The average household size was 2.37 and the average family size was 2.96.

The county population contained 25.10% under the age of 18, 5.50% from 18 to 24, 23.70% from 25 to 44, 24.20% from 45 to 64, and 21.60% who were 65 years of age or older. The median age was 42 years. For every 100 females there were 98.40 males. For every 100 females age 18 and over, there were 98.60 males.

The median income for a household in the county was $32,515, and the median income for a family was $40,072. Males had a median income of $30,240 versus $21,320 for females. The per capita income for the county was $16,525. About 8.00% of families and 10.20% of the population were below the poverty line, including 11.30% of those under age 18 and 10.40% of those age 65 or over.
5 Communities
5.1 Cities

    Donaldson
    Hallock (county seat)
    Halma
    Humboldt
    Karlstad
    Kennedy
    Lake Bronson (named "Bronson" until 1939)
    Lancaster
    St. Vincent

5.2 Unincorporated communities

    Caribou
    Northcote
    Noyes
    Orleans
    Robbin

5.3 Ghost town

    Pelan

5.4 Townships

    Arveson Township
    Cannon Township
    Caribou Township
    Clow Township
    Davis Township
    Deerwood Township
    Granville Township
    Hallock Township
    Hampden Township
    Hazelton Township
    Hill Township
    Jupiter Township
    Norway Township
    Pelan Township
    Percy Township
    Poppleton Township
    Richardville Township
    St. Joseph Township
    St. Vincent Township
    Skane Township
    South Red River Township
    Spring Brook Township
    Svea Township
    Tegner Township
    Teien Township
    Thompson Township

5.5 Unorganized territories

    East Kittson
    McKinley
    North Red River

6 Politics

Kittson County has been a swing county for several decades, tending to vote Democratic. In 60% of national elections since 1980, the county selected the Democratic Party candidate (as of 2020).
Presidential election results
7 See also

    National Register of Historic Places listings in Kittson County, Minnesota

8 References

"State & County QuickFacts". United States Census Bureau. Archived from the original on August 6, 2011. Retrieved September 1, 2013.
"Find a County". National Association of Counties. Archived from the original on May 31, 2011. Retrieved June 7, 2011.
"Minnesota Place Names". Minnesota Historical Society. Archived from the original on June 20, 2012. Retrieved March 18, 2014.
Upham, Warren. Minnesota Geographic Names, pp. 276–279 (1920). Accessed March 16, 2019
Jane Helmke (2008). "Struggle for survival in Kittson County". KARE. Archived from the original on January 27, 2013. Retrieved November 24, 2009.
Kittson County MN Google Maps (accessed 16 March 2019)
""Find an Altitude/Kittson County MN" Google Maps (accessed March 16, 2019)". Archived from the original on May 21, 2019. Retrieved March 16, 2019.
"2010 Census Gazetteer Files". US Census Bureau. August 22, 2012. Archived from the original on September 21, 2013. Retrieved October 18, 2014.
Nelson, Steven (2011). Savanna Soils of Minnesota. Minnesota: Self. pp. 57–60. ISBN 978-0-615-50320-2.
"Population and Housing Unit Estimates". Retrieved March 26, 2020.
"US Decennial Census". US Census Bureau. Archived from the original on April 26, 2015. Retrieved October 18, 2014.
"Historical Census Browser". University of Virginia Library. Retrieved October 18, 2014.
"Population of Counties by Decennial Census: 1900 to 1990". US Census Bureau. Retrieved October 18, 2014.
"Census 2000 PHC-T-4. Ranking Tables for Counties: 1990 and 2000" (PDF). US Census Bureau. Retrieved October 18, 2014.

    Leip, David. "Atlas of US Presidential Elections". uselectionatlas.org. Retrieved September 19, 2018.

Places adjacent to Kittson County, Minnesota

    vte

Municipalities and communities of Kittson County, Minnesota, United States

    vte

 State of Minnesota
Authority control Edit this at Wikidata	

    LCCN: n79088964 VIAF: 158265505 WorldCat Identities: lccn-n79088964

Coordinates: 48.78°N 96.78°W
Navigation menu
Page actions

    ArticleTalkEdit this pageHistory––MoveWatchCSDPRODXFDRPPTagLastUnlinkRater

Personal tools

    Dthomsen8Alerts (0)Notices (0)TalkSandboxPreferencesBetaWatchlistContributionsLog out

Pembina County and Cass County. Parts of the original county are now parts of 24 counties.

Minnesota

Morrison County
Stearns County
Todd County
Otter Tail County
Grant County
Douglas County
Pope County
Stevens County
Wilkin County
Traverse County
Big Stone County

South Dakota

Roberts County
Marshall County
Day County
Brown County
McPherson County
Edmunds County
Campbell County
Walworth County

North Dakota

Richland County
Sargent County
Dickey County
McIntosh County
Emmons County

References

http://historical-county.newberry.org/website/USA/viewer.htm

Former counties of Minnesota
1849 establishments in Minnesota Territory
1851 disestablishments in Minnesota Territory
Geography of Minnesota
Geography of North Dakota
Geography of South Dakota